Bruce Gaston may refer to:

Bruce Gaston (American football) (born 1991), American football player from Illinois
Bruce Gaston (musician) (1947–2021), expatriate American musician in Thailand